Lajas, known historically and culturally as Santa Isabel de las Lajas, is a municipality and town in the Cienfuegos Province of Cuba.

Demographics
In 2004, the municipality of Lajas had a population of 22,602.

See also
Municipalities of Cuba
List of cities in Cuba

References

External links

 Lajas on EcuRed

Populated places in Cienfuegos Province